Mariette Rix (born 8 April 1981) is a South African field hockey player who competed in the 2008 Summer Olympics and 2012 Summer Olympics. Currently, Rix serves as a hockey coach at the Woodbridge School.

References

External links

1981 births
Living people
South African female field hockey players
Female field hockey goalkeepers
Olympic field hockey players of South Africa
Field hockey players at the 2008 Summer Olympics
Field hockey players at the 2012 Summer Olympics
Field hockey players at the 2006 Commonwealth Games
Commonwealth Games competitors for South Africa